GDL may refer to:Guadalajara

Computing 
 Game Description Language
 Generalized distributive law
 Genomics Digital Lab, a series of educational games
 Geometric Description Language
 Gesture Description Language
 GNU Data Language
 Google Developers Live

Other uses 
 Dirasha language
 Gas diffusion layer of a proton-exchange membrane fuel cell
 Gas Dynamics Laboratory, a Soviet rocket research and development laboratory 
 Gas dynamic laser
 Gateway Distriparks, an Indian logistics company
 , a German trade union
 Glucono delta-lactone, a food additive
 Godley railway station, in England
 Goyim Defense League, an internet troll network
 Graduate Diploma in Law
 Graduated driver licensing
 Guadalajara International Airport, in Mexico
 Guadeloupe, ITU code
 Grand Duchy of Lithuania